Takruk-e Sofla (also Romanized as Takrūk-e Soflá; also known as Takrūk-e Pā’īn) is a village in Piveh Zhan Rural District, Ahmadabad District, Mashhad County, Razavi Khorasan Province, Iran. As of the 2006 census, its population was 107, in 28 families.

References 

Populated places in Mashhad County